A. V. Gurava Reddy is an Internationally recognized, Indian Orthopedic Surgeon and Joint replacement expert. He is the Managing Director and Chief Joint Replacement Surgeon at Sunshine Bone and Joint Institute – Sunshine Hospitals, a 300-bed NABH Accredited, Multispeciality hospital in Hyderabad India. A. V. Gurava Reddy is one of the leading surgeon(s) in India and performs about 4000 joint replacements per year. He has made sustained efforts to increase the awareness and acceptance of Joint replacement surgery in India.

Education
M.B.B.S From Guntur Institute of Medical Sciences, Andhra Pradesh, India
D.Ortho-DNB from Sancheti Institute of Orthopedics and Rehabilitation, Pune, India 
M.Ch. Ortho, University of Liverpool, England
FRCS (London)
FRCS (Glasgow)
FRCS (Edinburgh)

Memberships
Member, Global Advisory Board, Depuy Johnson & Johnson Company
Member, Global Advisory Committee, Stryker International
Member, Global International Investigators Committee for CR-150

Innovations in the field of Arthroplasty
Introduced the concept of Bilateral Simultaneous total knee replacement in India: wherein the patients undergo both knee replacements in the same sitting thereby leading to a shorter period of rehabilitation, shorter stay away from home for outstation patients and reduction in the cost of 30% of cost on consumables to the patient.
Introduced Bilateral staggered total knee replacement where the patients are not fit due to advanced age or comorbidities, where the knee replacement are done 3 days apart
Rapid recovery protocol: concept of having selective patients being made to walk within 4 hours of surgery. This involves preemptive analgesia and special intraarticular injections at the time of surgery to give pain relief to the patients. The patients are discharged home after 48 hours and domiciliary care is provided.
First to introduce "Computer aided navigation for Total knee Replacements" in Andhra Pradesh.

Academics
Visiting Faculty at Badr-al-Sama Hospital Muscat, Oman
Visiting Faculty at the Goa Medical College for Revision Knee Arthroplasty
Chairman of Sunshine Medical Academy of Research & Training
Program Director, Arthroplasty Fellowship at Sunshine Bone & Joint Institute
Authored a chapter in the “DELTA” compendium published by Delta group, Australia
Co-Author, Research Made Easy
Program Director, Diplomat at National Board (DNB)
Tutor for FRCS & MRCS Training courses
Examiner for FRCS/MRCS
Conducted International & National conferences like DELTA Course, ISHKS
Trains 10 post MS Orthopaedicians in Arthroplasty fellowships every 6 months and hosts about 40 shorter term trainings from India and abroad

Clinical Investigator
Conducting research in Collaboration with CCMB to identify Early Biomarkers to diagnose Osteo Arthritis of the Knee and Degenerative disease of the Spine
Collaborating with the University of Christchurch University, Canterbury UK on Stem cell research for treatment of Knee Arthritis 
Established Level 1 trauma centre at Sunshine Bone and Joint Institute is recognized as an Academic Partner by the GVK EMRI to train the paramedics in Emergency Trauma care and Resuscitation
Conducted 6th National Conference of Indian Society of Hip & Knee Surgeons (ISHKS) at Sunshine Hospitals. 
Founder Member and Organizing secretary of ISHKS 
Principal Investigator for Multi National, Multi center randomized clinical trial for Depuy knee implant (CR-150 Paper link)
Published internationally reviewed journal articles

Awards and honours
Lifetime Achievement Award for Contribution to Healthcare (coordinated by IMA, Govt of AP, Indo-Global)
Felicitated by Indo-German Orthopedic Foundation
“Top Adult Reconstructive Orthopedic Surgeon in India” award from Leading physician of the World, USA
“Outstanding citizen of Andhra Pradesh” by Indian Express Group
Felicitated with the “Distinguished Doctor” award by British International Doctors Association in recognition of his pioneering
Felicitated with the “Paul Harris Fellow” by Rotary International
Excellence Award by Delhi Telugu Academy, Ugadi Puraskar 2010 for contribution in field of medicine.
“Vocational Excellence Award” by Rotary International District.

Popular Media
Wrote a book – Guruvayanam – A collection of his musings on life
Member, Editorial Advisory Board for Family Health Guide, Indian Express
Acted in a comical teleserial named “Amrutham”
Columnist in Andhra Jyoti's Navya
“Dr. Gurava Reddy to kaburlu” – on Radio Tharanga,  an Internet global radio as a Radio Jockey and “Life of an Entrepreneur” on Telugu One Radio
"Dr. Gurava Reddy" Own Website is

References

 

Living people
Telugu people
Indian medical researchers
Indian chief executives
Businesspeople from Andhra Pradesh
20th-century Indian medical doctors
People from Guntur district
Indian orthopedic surgeons
Year of birth missing (living people)
20th-century surgeons